Harrison Township is one of the twelve townships of Preble County, Ohio, United States.  The 2000 census found 4,601 people in the township, 2,428 of whom lived in the unincorporated portions of the township.

Geography
Located in the northeastern corner of the county, it borders the following townships:
Twin Township, Darke County - north
Monroe Township, Darke County - northeast
Clay Township, Montgomery County - east
Perry Township, Montgomery County - southeast corner
Twin Township - south
Washington Township - southwest corner
Monroe Township - west
Butler Township, Darke County - northwest corner

Two incorporated villages are located in Harrison Township: Lewisburg, in the south, and part of Verona, in the northeast.

Name and history
Harrison Township was named for William Henry Harrison, a U.S. Army officer and afterward 9th President of the United States. It is one of nineteen Harrison Townships statewide.

Government
The township is governed by a three-member board of trustees, who are elected in November of odd-numbered years to a four-year term beginning on the following January 1. Two are elected in the year after the presidential election and one is elected in the year before it. There is also an elected township fiscal officer, who serves a four-year term beginning on April 1 of the year after the election, which is held in November of the year before the presidential election. Vacancies in the fiscal officership or on the board of trustees are filled by the remaining trustees.

References

External links
 https://sites.google.com/site/harrisontwppc/home
County website

Townships in Preble County, Ohio
Townships in Ohio